Erakat, Erekat, Erikat or Arekat and Arikat, Ereiqat  is a Palestinian surname that may refer to
Kamel Arekat (1901–1984), Palestinian Jordanian militant and politician
Noura Erakat (born 1980), Palestinian American lawyer and human right activist
Saeb Erekat (1955–2020), Palestinian diplomat
Yousef Erakat, American YouTube personality, brother of Noura

Arabic-language surnames